WSEC (channel 14) is a PBS member television station licensed to Jacksonville, Illinois, United States. Owned by Southern Illinois University, it is a sister station to WSIU-TV in Carbondale. WSEC's transmitter is located south of Franklin, Illinois; master control and most internal operations are based on the SIU campus in Carbondale.

WSEC operates two full-time satellites, WMEC (channel 22) in Macomb and WQEC (channel 27) in Quincy. WMEC's transmitter is located near Colchester, while WQEC's transmitter is on Ellington Road northeast of Quincy. A digital translator located in Springfield, W08DP, formerly broadcast on VHF channel 8 for full coverage in that metropolitan area. W08DP's license was cancelled by the Federal Communications Commission (FCC) on August 4, 2021, due to the translator not obtaining a license for digital operation by the July 13 deadline.

The three-station network serves as the PBS member for the Quincy television market (defined by Nielsen), as well as the western portion of the Champaign–Springfield–Decatur market. It serves a large and mostly rural area of western Illinois, northeastern Missouri and southeastern Iowa.

History

Educational consortium
By 1970, there was still no educational television station to serve west-central Illinois. Outer areas of the region could receive one of a number of stations: WILL-TV in Urbana, WTVP in Peoria, Iowa Public Television from KIIN-TV in Iowa City, and KETC in St. Louis; cable providers offered one or more of these stations.

The West Central Illinois Educational Telecommunications Corporation (a consortium of Bradley University in Peoria, Western Illinois University in Macomb, Blackhawk Community College in Moline, and Sangamon State University in Springfield) was incorporated on February 9, 1976. Bylaws for the corporation were approved on January 13, 1984.

The name Convocom was adopted in 1978 for the corporation; George Hall, former general manager of the UNC-TV network in North Carolina, was appointed its first president that year. The network's initial design included WTVP as well as new transmitters in Moline (WQPT-TV) and Jacksonville, to serve Macomb.

With Quincy having been added to account for changes to the Jacksonville transmitter after the tower of WJJY-TV collapsed in a 1978 ice storm, design for Convocom, prepared by D. L. Markley and Associates, included five broadcast transmitters. Network control and downlink of PBS programming would occur at the only existing facility, Peoria's WTVP. WQPT-TV in Moline, WIUM-TV in Macomb, WQEC in Quincy, and WJPT in Jacksonville (serving Springfield) would operate as satellites. Larger urban areas in the region were considered crucial for ongoing community support and sufficient financial support (grants, fundraising) to cover operational costs of the non-commercial educational network.

A series of financial and technical woes waylaid the project. In 1979, Illinois governor James R. Thompson vetoed a bill that would have given $1 million to Convocom due to budgetary constraints, prompting the consortium to run out of money; much of its spending had been on equipment, including $1.5 million for the purchase of the WJJY-TV facility, whose tower collapsed in a 1978 ice storm. The agency's remnants shifted toward microwave interconnection of regional higher education institutions, and in January 1981, Black Hawk College opted to take plans into its own hands and start a station of its own.

Building the network
In January 1982, the Convocom television station project was revived by a federal grant, which, together with local matching funds totaled $745,000, would provide for construction of transmitters to serve the most populous area of the country without public television; two years later, the first phase of the communications network was in service, connecting schools in Peoria, Springfield, Macomb and Jacksonville.

By 1983, a site west of Waverly was selected as the site for an  tower for WJPT. However, the FCC only licensed WJPT for 34 kilowatts of broadcast power at that specific location. As a result, WJPT only had a fringe (grade B) signal in Springfield, leaving it all but unviewable in the capital except on cable. A site east of Quincy owned by Blackhawk of Quincy, Inc. was selected for a new  tower for WQEC. Convocom had to raise $5.5 million to complete construction of these planned and unplanned replacement facilities.

George Hall resigned as President of Convocom in 1982 to serve as Virginia's director of telecommunications under Governor Chuck Robb. The consortium appointed Dr. Jerold Gruebel as its executive director in April 1983. Gruebel had previously served as the assistant director of Indiana Higher Education Telecommunications System (IHETS), a statewide network of video, voice, and data networks connecting all 77 of Indiana's colleges and universities with headquarters in Indianapolis.

Black Hawk College built WQPT in Moline, which signed on November 2, 1983, to serve the Quad Cities metropolitan area. While Black Hawk remained a member of Convocom, WQPT operated separately. Western Illinois University-Quad Cities assumed ownership of WQPT in 2010 and began a series of capital improvements. On June 30, 2014, master control for WQPT was migrated and centralized at WTVP in Peoria, as envisioned in the original 1970s D.L. Markley & Associates design.

On August 11, 1984, the first of the Convocom transmitters, WJPT in Jacksonville, began broadcasting; equipment had arrived for the Macomb transmitter and for the Quincy transmitter, WQEC. The remaining transmitters came on air in the months that followed: WIUM-TV in Macomb signed on October 1, 1984, and it was joined by WQEC in Quincy on March 9, 1985.

Smaller network and change in mission
Over the next ten years, regional, political, and consortium membership change led to revisions in financial support and a different mission statement. Convocom's service region in 1985 was smaller than the original 1970s D.L. Markley & Associates design. In 1989, Jerold Gruebel argued that Convocom offices in Springfield would permit access to Illinois legislators as well as the Illinois Board of Higher Education. The network was also interested in increasing its circulation in Springfield; only cable viewers received its output until the agency received federal funding to build a translator in Springfield, as well as one for Kirksville, Missouri, in 1989.

Relocation of offices from Peoria to Springfield was one of several changes during the late 1980s and 1990s. In 1989, a new marketing and branding program changed the FCC call signs for two of the three Convocom broadcast facilities: WIUM-TV became WMEC and WJPT became WSEC, to identify them as the "educational channels" for Macomb and Springfield. The influence of higher education institutions also waned. On July 1, 1995, new laws took effect that realigned the public higher educational structure in Illinois. The Board of Regents and Board of Governors were abolished, replaced with individual governing boards, and Sangamon State University was merged with the University of Illinois system as the University of Illinois at Springfield.

In 1998, to address reception problems in Springfield from WSEC at Waverly, a 1,400-watt translator was built in the city, originally broadcasting on channel 65 as W65BV. Previously, Springfield viewers could only get an acceptable signal via cable and satellite. This translator was moved to VHF channel 8 in 2001 and became W08DP; channel 8 was also WSEC's position on the Springfield cable system. The channel change came as part of other moves. Convocom moved from the UIS campus to new facilities near Glenwood High School in Chatham (ending the use of Peoria as its reception point for programs), and it contracted with Oregon Public Broadcasting to schedule programs outside of prime time, in order to provide a more distinctive service compared to WILL-TV. The Convocom system rebranded as "Network Knowledge" in 2004.

Transition to digital television
In 1998, the FCC mandated that broadcast stations migrate from analog (NTSC) to digital (ATSC) television transmission in the United States. This had the effect of imposing an unfunded federal mandate on public television stations, one Gruebel called the largest in history.

Iowa Public Television, which operates a statewide television and telecommunications network with nine high-power digital transmitters and eight translators, spent $47,000,000 to complete the digital television conversion, but it was financially supported by the state of Iowa, the U.S. Department of Commerce, and the Corporation for Public Broadcasting in that endeavor. Support for Network Knowledge's digital conversion was less. In May 2001, the state of Illinois granted Convocom almost $1 million for the digital conversion. The total cost came in at $20 million; Network Knowledge was able to raise $14.9 million of that, but a bank loan was necessary to pay for the rest. Further cash was raised by the sale of the Quincy transmitter tower in 2010 and of land surrounding the Macomb transmitter in 2012. It still owed $3.5 million in digital transition costs when it sold itself to SIU in 2018.

In January 2008, WTVP in Peoria faced financial difficulties after their digital television upgrade and studio relocation from Bradley University, an original member of the Convocom consortium, to a new Peoria riverfront studio and offices. A special campaign, Save Our Station, generated thousands of special contributions and led to an agreement with the bank.

An experimental collaboration involving joint management and operational cooperation of WTVP with WILL-TV and the University of Illinois worked well enough that the WTVP Board of Directors voted in December 2013 to extend this cooperative agreement for an additional three years. The overall purpose of the agreement was to help both public broadcasting stations operate more cost-effectively in serving eastern and central Illinois.

In July 2008, WQPT—owned by Black Hawk College, an original member of the Convocom consortium—lost financial support when the station was removed from the college's FY2009 fiscal budget. In May 2010, WQPT was sold to Western Illinois University-Quad Cities, with the primary objective to return WQPT to its original mission of creating more local and public affairs programming. The station moved from its longtime home on Black Hawk's campus to new studios and offices in Riverfront Hall on the WIU-QC Campus on July 1, 2014.

In 2009, Network Knowledge—highly reliant on grants, as only six percent of its audience donated—also lost its grant support. The organization received an annual average of $750,000 from three foundations in Quincy and one foundation in Decatur. Due to their own economic shortfalls, Gruebel said, none of these organizations gave grants to the network. The same year, Network Knowledge applied for assistance from the Corporation for Public Broadcasting (CPB)'s financial distress program.

In 2016, the network announced major cutbacks in over-the-air broadcasting times to save money due to the Illinois state budget stand-off, along with other cuts from donors and production contracts. Starting on May 6, 2016, the network broadcast from 10 a.m. to 10 p.m. on weekdays and 10 a.m. to 11 p.m. on weekends. Cable and AT&T U-verse viewers were not affected, since the station continued to feed morning programs through a direct fiber optic link to Comcast.

Sale to SIU
On November 29, 2018, West Central Illinois Educational Telecommunications Corporation announced that it had sold the three Network Knowledge stations to Southern Illinois University, which operates WSIU-FM-TV in Carbondale, as well as its associated satellites, for $1.5 million. The deal took effect on November 1; longtime network president and CEO Jerold Gruebel gave up station management on November 1 and switched from full-time to part-time work about a month later. The sale was part of a larger partnership between Network Knowledge and WSIU that had been announced on October 26 in hopes of preserving public television in western and central Illinois. A State Journal-Register story said that viewers would not notice a difference in program quality, but that viewers in the Network Knowledge territory would gain access to more national PBS programming.

Master control operations for both WSIU and the former Network Knowledge were combined in an outsourcing agreement with Public Media Management in 2019.

Programming

Local programming

Network Knowledge produces several regularly scheduled programs each month, including:
 Cardia (monthly; hosted by Mark McDonald and Dr. Gregory Mishkel; produced by Mark McDonald)
 CapitolView (weekly; hosted by Bernie Schoenberg and John Patterson; produced by Scott Troehler)
 Illinois Stories (3 times per week; produced and hosted by Mark McDonald)
 InLife: Stories from Western Illinois (monthly; hosted by Becky Cramblit; produced by Scott Troehler and Becky Cramblit)
 Lawmakers (monthly; hosted by Mark McDonald; produced by Scott Troehler)

Special programming has included:
 Expedition United Kingdom (2005) (hosted by Becky Cramblit, produced by Scott Troehler)
 Expedition Scotland (2006)(hosted by Becky Cramblit, produced by Scott Troehler)
 Expedition United Kingdom (2007) (hosted by Becky Cramblit, produced by Scott Troehler)
 Building Stories (hosted by Dave Leonatti with Anthony Rubano, produced by Scott Troehler)
 Making Conversation; Downtown Springfield Inc. Annual Awards; Greater Springfield Chamber of Commerce Annual Gala

Technical information

Subchannels
The stations' digital signals are multiplexed:

Analog-to-digital conversion
During 2009, in the lead-up to the analog-to-digital television transition that would ultimately occur on June 12, Network Knowledge shut down the analog transmitters of its stations on a staggered basis. The dates each analog transmitter ceased operation as well as their post-transition channel allocations are:
 WMEC shut down its analog signal, over UHF channel 22, on February 17, 2009, the original target date in which full-power television in the United States was to transition from analog to digital broadcasts under federal mandate (which was later pushed back to June 12, 2009). The station's digital signal remained on its pre-transition UHF channel 21. Through the use of PSIP, digital television receivers display the station's virtual channel as its former UHF analog channel 22.
 WQEC shut down its analog signal, over UHF channel 27, on February 17, 2009. The station's digital signal remained on its pre-transition UHF channel 34. Through the use of PSIP, digital television receivers display the station's virtual channel as its former UHF analog channel 27.
 WSEC shut down its analog signal, over UHF channel 14, on June 12, 2009, the official date in which full-power television stations in the United States transitioned from analog to digital broadcasts under federal mandate. The station's digital signal remained on its pre-transition UHF channel 15. Through the use of PSIP, digital television receivers display the station's virtual channel as its former UHF analog channel 14.

References

External links
"WSEC to be called Network Knowledge" - from the Herald & Review (Decatur, Illinois)

PBS member networks
Television stations in Illinois
Television channels and stations established in 1984
1984 establishments in Illinois
Jacksonville, Illinois